Bethesda Urban District was a former local government unit covering the Bethesda area in Caernarfonshire in existence 1894–1974, when it was replaced by District of Arfon.

Urban districts of Wales
Caernarfonshire
Bethesda, Gwynedd
1894 establishments in Wales